Marilyn Edwards (born 1937 or 1938) is an American politician who served the 88th district in the Arkansas House of Representatives from 2003 to 2009. Between 1968 and 2016, she was a Washington County employee, clerk and judge. She is a member of the United Methodist Church.

References

Living people
Democratic Party members of the Arkansas House of Representatives
County judges in Arkansas
Women state legislators in Arkansas
Year of birth missing (living people)